Leptocarpus laxus  is a rush species of the genus Leptocarpus in the family Restionaceae. It is endemic to the south-west of Western Australia.

Habitat 
It grows in moist to wet soils, in swamps, creeks, seasonally wet sites, and near road ditches.

Taxonomy 
It was first described by Robert Brown in 1810 as Restio laxus, a name he gave to two Restio species. This problem of two species with the same name was corrected by Kurt Sprengel in 1825 when he published the name, Restio diffusus, for this species.
In 1998, Lawrie Johnson and Barbara Briggs transferred R. diffusus to the genus, Leptocarpus.
In 2001 in consideration of IUCN rules, the species Leptocarpus diffusus  was renamed Leptocarpus laxus by  Barbara Briggs.

References

External links 

 Leptocarpus laxus occurrence data from the Australasian Virtual Herbarium

Restionaceae

Taxa named by Robert Brown (botanist, born 1773)
Plants described in 1810
Flora of Western Australia